Roberto Abugattas Aboino (born 17 January 1943) is a Peruvian high jumper. He competed in the 1964 and 1968 Summer Olympics.

References

1943 births
Living people
Athletes (track and field) at the 1964 Summer Olympics
Athletes (track and field) at the 1968 Summer Olympics
Peruvian male high jumpers
Olympic athletes of Peru
Pan American Games medalists in athletics (track and field)
Pan American Games bronze medalists for Peru
Athletes (track and field) at the 1963 Pan American Games
Athletes (track and field) at the 1967 Pan American Games
People from Pisco, Peru
Medalists at the 1967 Pan American Games
Universiade medalists in athletics (track and field)
Universiade bronze medalists
Medalists at the 1963 Summer Universiade